Barbara Brandt (born 1936) is an American spinto soprano, known especially for her association with contemporary opera.

Brand won both the local and regional Metropolitan Opera Auditions in 1966. Active at Minnesota Opera since 1967, she appeared in a number of world premieres with the company during her career. These include:

Lady With a Cake Box in Postcard from Morocco by Dominick Argento (1971)
Witch/Anne Sexton in Transformations by Conrad Susa (1973)
Pauline l'Allemand in Black River, a Wisconsin Idyll by Conrad Susa (1975)
Mrs. Poe in The Voyage of Edgar Allan Poe by Dominick Argento (1976)
title role in Claudia Legare by Robert Ward (1978)

She also created the role of the Bird Woman in The Wanderer by Paul and Martha Boesing for Houston Grand Opera in 1970. Brandt sang with the Minnesota Orchestra, the St. Paul Chamber Orchestra, the Aspen Festival Orchestra, and the Kansas City Philharmonic during her career, and performed a wide variety of roles on stage; among these were Pamina in The Magic Flute, the Countess in Le nozze di Figaro, and Elle in La voix humaine.

References

1942 births
Living people
American operatic sopranos
20th-century American women opera singers
21st-century American women